David or Dave Dick may refer to:

Dave Dick (Australian footballer) (1901–1982), Australian rules footballer
David Dick (soccer), American soccer player
Dave Dick (jockey) (1924–2001), British jockey

"David Dick", 1834 story by Roger de Beauvoir

See also 
David Dicks (born 1978), Australian sailor